Talking in Your Sleep may refer to:
Somniloquy, the act of talking while asleep
"Talking in Your Sleep" (Crystal Gayle song), 1978
"Talking in Your Sleep" (The Romantics song), 1983
Talking in Your Sleep (The Cinema album), 2014
Talking in Your Sleep (Lena Philipsson album), 1988
"Talking in Your Sleep", a song by Gordon Lightfoot from the album Summer Side of Life